Marange may refer to:

 Marange diamond fields, town and diamond fields in the Marange Tribal Trustland of Manicaland Province, eastern Zimbabwe
 Florian Marange (born 1986), a French footballer (soccer player)
 Johane Marange, aka Johane Maranke, Christian leader in Zimbabwe
 Marange Hera, brother of Seke Hera and minor chief in pre-colonial south-central Africa (Mashonaland), see Seke Rural

See also
Merengue (disambiguation)
Various wine making communes in France:
Cheilly-lès-Maranges, in Saône-et-Loire department
Dezize-lès-Maranges, in Saône-et-Loire department
Marange-Silvange, in Moselle department
Marange-Zondrange, in Moselle department
Sampigny-lès-Maranges, in Saône-et-Loire department